Presently used as a waterfowl hunting lodge, The Elms is a historic plantation house in rural Jefferson County, Arkansas.  Located a short way south of Altheimer, it is a -story raised Louisiana cottage, an architectural form that is extremely rare in Arkansas.  It is a -story wood-frame structure, set on a raised basement.  A porch extends across the front, with jigsawn balustrade, and the main roof is pierced by three gabled dormers.  The house was built in 1866 by Dr. Samuel Jordon Jones.  Today, the house serves as the centerpiece of The Elms Lodges & Leases, a commercial duck hunting business. 

The building was listed on the National Register of Historic Places in 1978.

See also
National Register of Historic Places listings in Jefferson County, Arkansas

References

External links
Elms Lodge web site

Houses on the National Register of Historic Places in Arkansas
Houses completed in 1866
Jefferson County, Arkansas
National Register of Historic Places in Jefferson County, Arkansas